Ibrahim Tahini (born 25 July 1987 in Freetown, Sierra Leone) is a Sierra Leonean footballer of Lebanese descent who plays as a forward. He is a free agent and his last club was Stenungsunds IF.

Early life
Tahini was born and raised in Freetown, Sierra Leone. He is of partial Lebanese descent and he is a graduate of the S. Edwards Secondary School in Freetown.

Career
He is a product of Sierra Leone's football club the Old Edwardians. Tahini was rated as one of the best young footballers in Sierra Leone during 2002 and 2003. He joined Edwardians after he completed secondary school in Freetown. Tahini played for six years for Old Edwardians and one year for Melleruds IF. In May 2010 he signed for another Swedish football club, the IK Oddevold from Uddevalla.

In May 2012, due to lack of playing time, a disappointed Tahini and his club IK Oddevold first agreed to terminate his contract, but then instead agreed to loan him out to lower league team Svarteborg Dingle IF .

On 4 July 2012 Tahini joined Vänersborgs IF on a loan deal.

He was last reported to be on a trial at FC Trollhättan.

Attributes
He is a natural left footed player who plays primarily on the left wing in midfield, but he can play at supporting striker position.

International career
Tahini was a member of the Sierra Leone Under-17 team that lost to Cameroon at the 2003 African under-17 Championship in Swaziland, where he started in all five games. He was also a regular starter for Sierra Leone during the 2003 Fifa Under-17 World Cup in Finland. Tahini, along with Samuel Barlay, Obi Metzger and Alimamy Sesay, were Sierra Leone's key players during the African 2003 under-17 Championship in Swaziland and the 2003 FIFA U-17 World Championship in Finland.

He made his senior international debut for Sierra Leone in a 2005 friendly match against Liberia in Freetown. He also featured for the Leone Stars (as the Sierra Leone national football team is known) during the  2005 Amilcar Cabral Cup (also known as Zone 2) held in Conakry, Guinea.

References

1987 births
Living people
Sportspeople from Freetown
Sierra Leonean footballers
Expatriate footballers in Sweden
Sierra Leone international footballers
IK Oddevold players
Sierra Leonean expatriate sportspeople in Sweden
Association football forwards
Sierra Leonean people of Lebanese descent
Sportspeople of Lebanese descent